TransContainer is an intermodal freight transport company based in Russia. It was founded as a subsidiary of RZD.

It is Russia's main intermodal container transport and integrated logistics company; it transports over a million TEUs per year. The company owns about 60% of the total flatcar fleet in Russia, holds 52% of the rail container transportation market and 32% of the container terminal handling market in Russia. TransContainer also owns about 60,000 ISO containers, owns a network of rail-side container terminals, which are located at 46 railway stations in Russia, and operates Dobra container terminal on the border of Slovakia and Ukraine. It also controls 50% of Kedentransservice, which offers terminal handling at 19 railway stations in Kazakhstan.

History

In October 2003, TransContainer  has started its activity, when the branch of “Russian Railways” PLC – the Center for the container  transportation  TransContainer  was established. In March 2006, the branch transformed into an open joint stock company - a subsidiary of “Russian Railways” PLC. On 1st of July 2006, the company has started its business operations. In December 2007, the company entered the share capital market, and in March 2008 - into the debt capital market. 

In 2010, TransContainer began an IPO, which valued the company at $1.32 billion; Fesco bought a 12.5% stake.

In March 2011, the company bought 67% of shares of the Kazakh railway terminal operator “Kedentransservice”. The deal amounted to $68 million.

In November 2014, “50% + 2 shares” owned by “Russian Railways” PLC were transferred to the authorized capital of “OTLK” LTD.

In 2014, PJSC TransContainer transported 1,467,000 TEU by its railcar fleet and handled 1,331,000 TEU via its terminals in Russia. For the same period, the company had revenue under IFRS of RUB 36,565 million (-6.6 % YoY) and Net Income decrease by 20,8% to RUB 3,658 million.

In February 2015, Moody’s Agency confirmed PJSC “TransContainer” credit rating of Ba3 with a stable forecast.

In October 2017, TransContainer PJSC opens the subsidiary company - TransContainer Freight Forwarding (Shanghai) Co., Ltd - in China in the Pilot Free Trade Zone of Shanghai.

In September 2018, PJSC TransContainer registered the subsidiary of CJSC TransContainer Mongolia in the Ulaanbaatar city and completed the acquisition of 100% of shares of CJSC Logistics Terminal.

On November 27, 2019, Sergey Shishkarev's Delo Group purchased from United Transportation and Logistics Company the United Transportation and Logistics Company stake in TransContainer, which is 50% plus two shares, bypassing Roman Abramovich and Vladimir Lisin bids.

On December 5, 2019, Rosatom's chief, Alexey Likhachev became a co-owner of TransContainer with 30% of the LLC Delo Management Company (UK Delo) which owns Delo Group in order to expedite Russia's development of its Northern Sea Route.

In March 2020, Delo Group consolidated 99.6% of the shares of TransContainer.

In August 2020, Delo Group completed the consolidation of 100% of TransContainer's shares.

Ownership
As of October 2018, the major shareholders:
 United Transportation and Logistics Company, joint venture established by Russian Railways, Belarusian Railway and Kazakhstan Temir Zholy – 50% +2 shares
 FESCO Transportation Group – 25%
 Yenisei Capital of Roman Abramovich – 24.5%.

As of December 2019, the major shareholders:
 Delo Group of Sergey Shishkarev using financing from Sberbank – 50% plus two shares
 Rosatom with Alexey Likhachev as director – 30% of LLC Delo Management Company (UK Delo) which owns Delo Group
 VTB – 24.84%
 Yenisei Capital of Roman Abramovich and Alexander Abramov – 24.74%
 other minority shareholders – 0.42%

References

Railway companies of Russia
Rail freight transport in Russia
Companies listed on the Moscow Exchange
Rail freight companies
Companies based in Moscow
Russian Railways